The 2022–23 Zambia Super League, known as the MTN Super League for sponsorship purposes, is the 62nd season of the top-tier association football league in Zambia which began on 20 August 2022. Red Arrows are the defending champions.

Teams
The league is composed of 18 teams; the 15 teams from the previous season and the promoted teams: Muza, NAPSA Stars, Nchanga Rangers and Lumwana Radiants.

Standings

Results

Top goalscorers

References

External links
 2022–23 League season summary via BetExplorer.com
 2022–23 League season summary via RSSSF

Zambia Super League
2022–23 in Zambian football
2022–23 in African association football leagues